Heifeng Guai, also translated as the Black Wind Demon, is a character from the 16th century Chinese novel Journey to the West. He is a demon based in a cave on Black Wind Mountain (黑風山). His true form is a black bear but he appears as a dark-complexioned man armed with a Black Tassel Spear. He steals Tang Sanzang's cassock during a fire. Sun Wukong goes to confront him later to take back the cassock but fails so he seeks help from Guanyin. The Black Wind Demon eventually surrenders to Guanyin and becomes the mountain's guardian deity.

References

Journey to the West characters
Chinese deities
Shapeshifting
Fictional demons and devils